Jang Hyun-Kyu  (22 August 1981 – 16 August 2012) was a South Korean footballer.

He was involved in the 2011 South Korean football betting scandal.

He died of a suspected heart attack at his home in Ulsan on 16 August 2012.

References

External links 

1981 births
2012 deaths
Association football defenders
South Korean footballers
Daejeon Hana Citizen FC players
Pohang Steelers players
Gimcheon Sangmu FC players
K League 1 players
Sportspeople from Ulsan
21st-century South Korean people